Bradley Simmons (born September 16, 1955) is an American sports shooter. He competed in the mixed skeet event at the 1976 Summer Olympics.

References

1955 births
Living people
American male sport shooters
Olympic shooters of the United States
Shooters at the 1976 Summer Olympics
Sportspeople from Houston